Jet ski at the 2010 Asian Beach Games was held from 14 December to 16 December 2010 in Muscat, Oman.

Medalists

Medal table

Results

Runabout open
15 December

Runabout 800 superstock
14 December

Runabout endurance open
16 December

Ski open
14 December

References
 Official site

2010 Asian Beach Games events